A bellwether is an indicator of trends, often in the context of politics. The term is derived from the practice of placing a bell on the neck of a wether (castrated ram) at the head of a herd of sheep.

Bellwether or The Bellwether may also refer to:

 Bellwether (novel), a 1996 Connie Willis novel
 A bellwether county in the United States
 A bellwether trial, a legal test case
 Bellwether Gallery, operating in New York City from 1999 to 2009
 Bellwether Pictures, a film studio established in 2011
 Bellwether Prize, a literary award established in 2000
 Dawn Bellwether, a character in the 2016 film Zootopia
 Mira Bellwether (born 1981/1982), author of the 'zine Fucking Trans Women